ATLast is the debut studio album from Christian hip hop musician Alex Faith. The album released on November 5, 2013 by Collision Records to select retailers such as iTunes and November 19, 2013 to all retailers. It charted on the Billboard 200 at No. 193.

Critical reception

ATLast garnered praise from the ratings and reviews of six music critics. Tony Cummings of Cross Rhythms rated the album a perfect ten squares, writing that "Alex said in an interview recently, 'Everyone goes through life trying to get somewhere. This destination we all have to arrive at is always and ultimately going to be at the feet of Jesus'", which the release "makes this point crystal clear". At Rapzilla, Nyon Smith rated the album three-and-a-half stars, stating that "ATLast is a standout in CHH, but after a while I began to feel that this should be the norm rather than the exception if the genre is to progress in its search for mainstream assimilation." Kevin Hoskins of Jesus Freak Hideout rated the album three-and-a-half stars, saying that "there are more positives than negatives to ATLast, so most will enjoy spinning this." At New Release Tuesday, Mark Ryan rated the album four stars, writing that he was "impressed" on a release which "is complete in every sense of the word." Anthony Peronto of Christian Music Zine rated the album four-and-a-half stars, stating that this is "authentic, honest, and creative hip hop and Alex Faith has delivered that substantially with ATLast." At The Christian Manifesto, Michael Wildes rated the album four stars, saying that "this is a solid release from Alex Faith and Collision Records on a whole."

Chart performance
For the Billboard charting week of November 23, 2013, ATLast charted at No. 193 on the Billboard 200, No. 12 and 4 on the Christian Albums and Top Gospel Albums charts, respectively, No. 16 on the Rap Albums, and No. 27 on the Independent Albums chart.

Track listing

Charts

References

2013 debut albums
Alex Faith albums